Coat of arms of Victoria may refer to:

Coat of arms of Victoria (Australia)
Coat of arms of Victoria, British Columbia
Coat of arms of Victoria, Chile
Coat of arms of Victoria, Gozo, Malta
Coat of arms of Ciudad Victoria, Mexico
Coat of arms of Victoria, Brașov, Romania
The personal coat of arms of Queen Victoria; see royal coat of arms of the United Kingdom

See also 
Victoria (disambiguation)